

Events 

 Alonso Lobo, Spanish composer, is appointed maestro de capilla by Seville Cathedral.
 Ruggiero Giovannelli, Italian composer and successor to Giovanni Pierluigi da Palestrina at St. Peter's, acquires post at Collegio Germanico in Rome.
 Giulio Belli, Italian composer, is appointed maestro di cappella at cathedral in Carpi, Italy.
 Giovanni Bernardino Nanino, Italian composer of the Roman School, is appointed maestro di cappella at S Luigi dei Francesi in Rome.
 John Bull becomes organist for Elizabeth I at the Chapel Royal.
 Emilio de' Cavalieri serves as a papal spy, engaging in several secret vote-buying missions to Florence.

Publications 
 Giammateo Asola
Second book of masses for five voices (Venice: Ricciardo Amadino)
3 Masses for six voices (Venice: Ricciardo Amadino)
 John Baldwin completes My Ladye Nevells Booke, a manuscript anthology of keyboard music by William Byrd
 Paolo Bellasio – Madrigals for three, four, five, six, seven, and eight voices (Venice: Ricciardo Amadino)
 William Byrd, Catholic composer in England, publishes his , Book 2, for five and six voices (London: Thomas East for William Byrd)
 Giovanni Croce –  for eight voices (Venice: Giacomo Vincenti), music for Compline, his first publication
 Scipione Dentice – First book of madrigals for five voices (Naples: Matteo Cancer)
 John Farmer – Divers and sundrie waies of two parts in one (London: Thomas East), a collection of vocal canons
 Stefano Felis
Third book of motets for five voices (Venice: Girolamo Scotto)
Sixth book of madrigals for five voices (Venice: Scipione Rizzo for Girolamo Scotto)
 Giovanni Giacomo Gastoldi – Balletti a5, published in Venice
 Gioseffo Guami – Fourth book of madrigals for five and six voices (Venice: Angelo Gardano)
 Adam Gumpelzhaimer
 (Augsburg: Valentin Schönigk), a music theory textbook in Latin and German
 for three voices (Augsburg: Valentin Schönigk)
 Hans Leo Hassler –  for four, five, six, seven, eight, and more voices (Augsburg: Valentin Schönigk), a large collection of motets
 Marc'Antonio Ingegneri – First book of motets for six voices (Venice: Angelo Gardano)
 Luca Marenzio – Fifth book of madrigals for six voices (Venice: Angelo Gardano)
Philippe de Monte – Sixth book of madrigals for six voices (Venice: Angelo Gardano)
 Johannes Nucius –  for five and six voices (Prague: Georg Nigrinus)
 Pietro Paolo Paciotto has his first book of masses published in Venice by Alessandro Gardano
 Giovanni Pierluigi da Palestrina, Italian composer, publishes a group of Magnificat settings, in Rome
 Andreas Pevernage – Fourth book of chansons for five voices (Antwerp: widow of Plantin & Jean Mourentorf)
 Giaches de Wert, Franco-Flemish composer, publishes his tenth book of madrigals

Births 

October 6 – Settimia Caccini, Italian composer and singer, younger daughter of Giulio Caccini and sister of Francesca Caccini (died 1638)
date unknown
Joseph Solomon Delmedigo, Cretan music theorist, in Candia (Iraklion) (died 1655)
Robert Dowland, lutenist and composer (died 1641)

Deaths 
January 7 – Jacobus de Kerle, Netherlandish composer
February 10 – Ambrose Lupo, court musician and composer to Tudor monarchs (date of birth unknown)
May 23 – John Blitheman, organist and composer (born 1525)
July 2 – Vincenzo Galilei, Italian composer, lutenist and music theorist, father of Galileo (born 1520)
July 18 – Jacobus Gallus (Jakob Handl), Slovene composer (born 1550)
July 30 – Andreas Pevernage, Flemish composer (born 1542/43)
date unknown
Joan Brudieu, composer (born 1520)
William Mundy, composer of sacred music (born 1529)

 
Music
16th century in music
Music by year